There are four orders of Monaco. These are:

 Order of Saint-Charles, founded on 15 March 1858 by Prince Charles III and modified on 23 December 1966 by Prince Rainier III;
 Order of the Crown (Ordre de la Couronne), founded on 20 July 1960 and modified on 23 December 1966 by Prince Rainier III;
 Order of Grimaldi (Ordre des Grimaldi), founded on 18 November 1954 and modified on 19 July 1960, as well 23 December 1966 by Prince Rainier III;
 Order of Cultural Merit (Ordre du Mérite culturel), founded on 31 December 1952 by Prince Rainier III.

Monaco has a number of other decorations, including:

  created on 5 February 1894 by Prince Albert I, modified on 20 April 1925 by Prince Louis II, again modified on 13 November 1952 by Prince Rainier III;
 , created on 16 October 1950 by Prince Rainier III;
 Citation For Exceptional Service, created on 7 April 1951 and modified on 23 December 1966 by Prince Rainier III;
 , created on 30 July 1993 by Prince Rainier III.

These are awarded by the Prince of Monaco, currently Albert II, Prince of Monaco.

Further reading

External links

Monaco Royal Orders and Decorations - Official website of the Prince's Palace of Monaco

 
Monaco-related lists